Lichen nitidus is a chronic inflammatory disease of unknown cause  characterized by 1–2 mm, discrete and uniform, shiny, flat-topped, pale flesh-colored or reddish-brown papules that may appear as hypopigmented against dark skin. Occasionally, minimal scaling is present or can be induced by rubbing the surface of the papules.  The disease usually affects children and young adults and is painless and usually nonpruritic, although protracted itching may occur in some cases. It is sometimes referred to by dermatologists as "mini lichen planus".

Presentation
Linear arrangements of these papules is common (referred to as a Koebner phenomenon), especially on the forearms, but may occasionally be grouped, though not confluent, on flexural areas.  Generally, the initial lesions are localized, and remain so, to the chest, abdomen, glans penis, and flexor aspects of the upper extremities; however, less commonly, the disease process can (1) be strictly isolated to the palms and soles, presenting with many hyperkeratotic, yellow papules that may coalesce into plaques that fissure or “...sometimes a non-specific keratoderma resembling chronic eczema,” or (2) become more widespread, with papules widely distributed on the body—the extensor surfaces of the elbows, wrists, and hands, folds of the neck, submammary region in females, groin, thighs, ankles, and feet—and fusing into erythematous, minimally scaled plaques, with redness that develops tints of violet, brown, and yellow.

Pathology

The histology of lichen nitidus is significant for a "...localized granulomatous lymphohistiocytic infiltrate in an expanded dermal papilla with thinning of overlying epidermis and downward extension of the rete ridges at the lateral margin of the infiltrate, producing a typical 'claw clutching a ball' picture...."

Treatment
Generally, lichen nitidus is asymptomatic and self-limited; therefore, no treatment is required.  However, if persistent pruritus is present, or the appearance “...interferes with daily activities or outlook...” topical glucocorticoids may be tried.  If the disease process is symptomatic, generalized and extensive, oral glucocorticoids may be indicated.  Other reported treatments include PUVA, UVA/UVB phototherapy, astemizole, acitretin, and etretinate.
When appears with sun/humidity; air conditioning (cool dry air) reduces swelling and discomfort.

History
Felix Pinkus first described the condition in 1907.

See also 
 Lichen planus
 List of cutaneous conditions

References

External links 

Lichen Nitidus at DermNet photo library

Lichenoid eruptions
Papulosquamous disorders